Spirotropis modiolus is an extinct species of sea snail, a marine gastropod mollusk in the family Drilliidae.

Description
The length of the shell attains 17 mm.

Distribution
Fossils were found in Pliocene strata of Italy; age range: 5.332 to 3.6 Ma.

References

  Janssen, R. (1993) Taxonomy, evolution and spreading of the turrid genus Spirotropis (Gastropoda: Turridae). Scripta Geologica, Special Issue 2, 237–261

External links
 

modiolus